Madhoganj is a town and Nagar Panchayat in Bilgram tehsil of Hardoi district, Uttar Pradesh, India. It is located on the north side of the main road from Sitapur to Kanpur, with other roads leading to Bilgram to the northwest, Mallawan to the south, and Beniganj and Balamau to the east. As of 2011, the population of Madhoganj is 11,523, in 2,180 households. It is also the seat of a community development block.

Geography
It has an average elevation of 131 metres (429 feet).

History
Madhoganj originated as a bazaar in the village of Rudamau. At the turn of the 20th century, it was described as "a thriving centre of trade in grain, cotton, and other articles." It had a post office, an upper primary school, and a police force of 11 officers.

Madhoganj's municipal board was established in 1872. In 1903, a railway branch line was built between Madhoganj and Balamau. Then in 1909, another line was built connecting Madhoganj with Sandi via Bilgram.

The 1961 census did not count Madhoganj among the urban areas of Hardoi district, due to "non-fulfilment of urban conditions." Madhoganj's market, held on Tuesdays and Fridays and mainly dealing in grain and kirana items, was recorded as having an average attendance of 6,000 people at the time.

Economy
As of 1971, the economy of Madhoganj was described as a hybrid between the commercial, service, and industrial sectors. The main items imported were jaggery, cloth, and raw groundnuts. The main items manufactured were groundnut oil, handloom cloth, and shoes. The biggest export was groundnut oil, followed by wheat and arhar.

Demographics

 India census, Madhoganj had a population of 11,523. Males constitute 53% of the population and females 47%. Madhoganj has an average literacy rate of 78.69%, higher than the national average of 74.04%: male literacy is 83.75%, and female literacy is 73.07%. In Madhoganj, 9% of the population is under 6 years of age.

Villages 
Madhoganj CD block has the following 105 villages:

References

Cities and towns in Hardoi district